Schoepite, empirical formula  (UO2)8O2(OH)12•12(H2O) is a rare alteration product of uraninite in hydrothermal uranium deposits. It may also form directly from ianthinite. The mineral presents as a transparent to translucent yellow, lemon yellow, brownish yellow, or amber orthorhombic tabular crystals. Although over 20 other crystal forms have been noted; rarely in microcrystalline aggregates. When exposed to air schoepite converts over a short time to the metaschoepite form (UO3 • H2O) within a few months of being exposed to ambient air.

The hardness is 2.5, density is 4.8 g/cm3, and it streaks yellow. 

It was first described from specimens from Shinkolobwe mine in Belgian Congo in 1923, several additional localities are known.

Schoepite was named to honor Alfred Schoep (1881–1966), Professor of Mineralogy at the University of Ghent, Belgium.

References

Uranium(VI) minerals
Oxide minerals
Orthorhombic minerals
Minerals in space group 29